Houston Roosevelt Hoover (born February 6, 1965) is a former American football offensive lineman in the NFL who played for the Atlanta Falcons, Cleveland Browns and Miami Dolphins. He played college football at Jackson State University.

References

1965 births
Living people
American football offensive guards
Atlanta Falcons players
Cleveland Browns players
Miami Dolphins players
Jackson State Tigers football players